The Ellen Glacier is a glacier in the central Sentinel Range of the Ellsworth Mountains of Antarctica.

It was first mapped by the United States Geological Survey from surveys and U.S. Navy air photos, 1957–59, and was named by the Advisory Committee on Antarctic Names for Lieutenant Colonel Cicero J. Ellen of the U.S. Air Force, who was in command of many of the air operations when the South Pole Station was established by air drop in the 1956–57 season.

Tributary glaciers
 Pulpudeva Glacier
 Crosswell Glacier
 Patton Glacier
 Rumyana Glacier
 Delyo Glacier
 Burdenis Glacier
 Gerila Glacier
 Fonfon Glacier
 Arapya Glacier

See also 
 List of glaciers in the Antarctic
 Glaciology

External links 
 Ellen Glacier. Copernix satellite image

References 

 

Glaciers of Ellsworth Land
Ellsworth Mountains